Alcima is a genus of parasitoid wasps belonging to the family Ichneumonidae and the subfamily Campopleginae.

The genus is known from the Palearctic region.

Species 
Three species are currently recognized.
 Alcima dbari   Khalaim, 2007
 Alcima orbitale  (Gravenhorst, 1829)
 Alcima pictor  Aubert, 1971

References

Campopleginae
Ichneumonidae genera